Fernando José Paulsen Silva (Santiago, 11 March 1956) is a Chilean radio journalist, television presenter, columnist, sports and political commentator.

Additional information is available on the Spanish Wikipedia Entry for Paulsen.

References

1956 births
Chilean journalists
Chilean television presenters
People from Santiago
Chilean columnists
Chilean radio journalists
Living people
Chilean television personalities
Chilean people of Danish descent
Chilean political commentators